Homacodontidae is an extinct  family of basal artiodactyl mammals from the early Eocene to late Oligocene of North America, Europe, and Asia.

Description
They were small animals, averaging about the size of a modern rabbit, had many primitive features. In life, they would have resembled a long-tailed muntjac or chevrotain. Dichobunids had four or five toes on each foot, with each toe ending in a small hoof. They had complete sets of teeth, unlike most later artiodactyls, with their more specialist dentitions. The shape of the teeth suggests they were browsers, feeding on small leaves, perhaps in the forest undergrowth. The shape of their bodies and limbs suggests they would have been fast-running animals, unlike most of their contemporaries.

Taxonomy
McKenna and Bell (1997) listed homacodonts as a subfamily of Dichobunidae. However, subsequent authors recognize Homacodontidae as a distinct family in its own right.

The following genera are listed below as per McKenna and Bell (1997), with few additions since:

Bunomeryx
Hylomeryx
Mesomeryx
Mytonomeryx
Gagadon
Pentacemylus
Hexacodus
Homacodon
Microsus
Texodon

References

Tylopoda
Eocene even-toed ungulates
Oligocene even-toed ungulates
Eocene first appearances
Chattian extinctions